John Emerson may refer to:

 John Wesley Emerson (1832–1899), U.S. lawyer, Civil War military commander, judge, and the founder of the Emerson Electric Company
 John Emerson (politician) (1859–1932), Canadian mayor
 John Emerson (filmmaker) (1874–1956), American stage actor, playwright, producer, and director of silent films
 John B. Emerson (born 1954), president of Capital Group Private Client Services, former Deputy Assistant to President Clinton, US ambassador to Germany
 John Haven Emerson (1906–1997), American inventor of biomedical devices
 John Emerson (died 1843), physician and slaveowner of Dred Scott

See also
 John Emmerson (disambiguation)
 "The Brain of John Emerson", a 1955 episode of Science Fiction Theatre